Jones-Emberson 1 (PK 164+31.1), also known as the Headphone Nebula, is a 14th magnitude planetary nebula in the constellation Lynx at a distance of 1600 light years. It is a larger planetary with low surface brightness. The 16.8-magnitude central star is a very blue white dwarf.

Historic data
Discovered in 1939 by Rebecca Jones and Richard M. Emberson, its "PK" designation comes from the names of Czechoslovakian astronomers Luboš Perek and Luboš Kohoutek, who in 1967 created an extensive catalog of all of the planetary nebulae known in the Milky Way as of 1964. The numbers indicate the position of the object on the sky. ("PK 164+31.1" basically represents the planetary nebula that when using the galactic coordinate system has a galactic longitude of 164 degrees, a galactic latitude of +31 degrees, and is the first such object in the Perek-Kohoutek catalog to occupy that particular one square degree area of sky).

Gallery

See also
List of planetary nebulae

External links
Catalogue of Galactic Planetary Nebulae - The PK Astronomical Catalog

References

Astronomical objects discovered in 1939
Planetary nebulae
Pegasus (constellation)